Hongqiao Airport Terminal 2 is an interchange station between Line 2 and Line 10 of the Shanghai Metro. The Line 2 portion opened on 16 March 2010, and the Line 10 part opened on 30 November 2010.

The metro station is located near both Terminal 2 of Hongqiao International Airport and the high-speed Shanghai Hongqiao railway station, the latter which opened on 1 July 2010.

This station is a "Virtual Interchange" station for passengers wishing to transfer between Line 10 Hongqiao Railway Station bound trains and Line 2 platform East Xujing bound trains. Passengers using Shanghai Public Transport Card (SPTC), T-Union Card or mobile phone QR-code can make the interchange within 30 minutes at no additional charge, while passengers using a single journey ticket must pay an additional fare because re-buying the ticket is required.

The new platform that opened on 30 December 2017 allows a direct, physical cross-platform interchange between Line 2 Pudong International Airport bound trains and Line 10 Jilong Road bound trains; passengers transferring between these two trains do not have to get out of the station. It's also possible for passengers in other platform to go across the train of Line 2 bound for Pudong International Airport or Line 10 bound for Jilong Road to go to another platform without getting out of the station.

Station layout

References 

Line 2, Shanghai Metro
Line 10, Shanghai Metro
Shanghai Metro stations in Minhang District
Railway stations in China opened in 2010
Airport railway stations in China